"Bring It On Home" is a song written by Greg Bieck, Tyler Hayes Bieck and Wayne Kirkpatrick and recorded by American country music group Little Big Town.  It was released January 2006 as the second single from their album The Road to Here.  This was the band's highest charting single until "Pontoon" hit number 1.

Content
"Bring It On Home" is a mid-tempo ballad where the male narrator promises to offer support to his lover at the end of a stressful day.

Critical reception
Deborah Evans Price, of Billboard magazine reviewed the song favorably saying that the song "boasts a warm, soothing melody and tender lyric." She goes on to say that "gorgeous harmonies turn a well-written song into an amazing experience."

Music video
A music video, directed by Kristin Barlowe, was released along with the song. The video peaked at number 1 on CMT's Top Twenty Countdown for two consecutive weeks in June 2006.

Chart performance

Year-end charts

References

2006 singles
Little Big Town songs
Songs written by Wayne Kirkpatrick
Equity Music Group singles
2005 songs
Country ballads
2010s ballads